Jan Aliabad (also Romanized as Jān ‘Alīābād) is a village in Otaqvar Rural District, Otaqvar District, Langarud County, Gilan Province, Iran. At the 2006 census, its population was 22, in 7 families.

References 

Populated places in Langarud County